Saint-Méen-le-Grand (Gallo: Saent-Men) is a commune in the Ille-et-Vilaine department in Brittany in northwestern France.

It is located west of Rennes between Montauban-de-Bretagne and Gaël.

The town was the birthplace of the 3-time Tour de France winner Louison Bobet and it hosted the start of Stage 8 of the 2006 Tour.

Population
Inhabitants of Saint-Méen-le-Grand are called mévennais in French.

See also
Saint-Méen Abbey
Communes of the Ille-et-Vilaine department

References

External links

Mayors of Ille-et-Vilaine Association 

Communes of Ille-et-Vilaine